Paddy Carr is a Gaelic football manager and former player. He has been manager of the Donegal county team since October 2022.

Early life
A secondary school principal, he is originally from Fanad in County Donegal, played for the Donegal county team and has been linked with the senior managerial post of his native county on several occasions.

He worked in the slums of Latin America in the 1980s.

Managerial career

Carr managed St. Oliver's CC to County and Provincial titles, taking them to the All-Ireland Vocational Final.

Carr managed Louth from 2002–2003. He played his underage football with Kilmacud Crokes while attending Oatlands College in Stillorgan. He made the switch to Walterstown in County Meath to play his senior football when he moved to live in Navan. He managed the Meath minor football team in 2007 and has previous managerial experience with both Louth and Meath clubs. He managed Meath Hill for a while. He was manager of the Kilmacud Crokes team that won the 2008 Dublin Senior Football Championship and 2008 Leinster Senior Final. He also won the 2009 All-Ireland Senior Club Football Championship with the club before going on to manage Ballymun Kickhams.

In October 2022, Carr was appointed for a two-year term as manager of the Donegal senior footballers, with a review planned following the first of those years. On the 29th of January 2023, Carr won his first game as Donegal manager against the reigning all Ireland champions Kerry.

References

Year of birth missing (living people)
Living people
All-Ireland Senior Club Football Championship winning managers
Donegal inter-county Gaelic footballers
Gaelic football managers
Heads of schools in Ireland
Kilmacud Crokes Gaelic footballers
Walterstown Gaelic footballers
People educated at Oatlands College